Hanna Nasir (alternately transliterated Hanna Nasser) is a Palestinian Christian academic and political figure. He holds a PhD in Nuclear Physics from Purdue University in the United States. Nasser was a long-time president of Birzeit University, which his father, Musa Nasser, founded. He directed the school's transition from a community college to an accredited university.  In November 1974 Nasser was exiled by the Israeli authorities.  He continued to serve as Birzeit's president in exile; while the school's vice-president managed its day-to-day business, Birzeit officials regularly visited Nasser in Amman to receive his input on major decisions.

Nasir served on the Executive Committee of the Palestine Liberation Organization between 1981 and 1984 and held the position of Head of the Palestine National Fund between 1982 and 1984. Nasir, along with 29 other exiles, was allowed to return to the West Bank in May 1993 as the peace process got under way. He remained president of Birzeit until his retirement in 2004.

In 2002, Yasser Arafat appointed Nasir to the post of Chairman of the Palestinian Central Elections Commission (CEC). The CEC was established by the Palestinian Authority 
in 1995 as an independent body, responsible for the conduct of elections in the Palestinian territories. In the post, Nasir oversaw the presidential election in 2005, the legislative election in 2006, and the local election in the West Bank in 2012 and 2017.

Personal
Hanna is the father of three sons and one daughter.

Nasir holds several honorary titles including the French Legion of Honour and an honorary Doctorate from the American University in Cairo.

See also
Palestinian Christians

Notes

Further reading
An extensive discussion of Nasir's career can be found in Gabi Baramki's Peaceful Resistance: Building a Palestinian University under Occupation, Pluto Press, October 2009.

Nuclear physicists
Palestinian physicists
Palestinian Christians
Palestinian politicians
Palestine Liberation Organization members
Academic staff of Birzeit University
Purdue University alumni
Living people
Year of birth missing (living people)